Peter Leepin (21 November 1920 in Basle – 24 July 1995) was a Swiss chess master.
 
He took 16th place at Munich 1941, where Gösta Stoltz won, took 4th in the Swiss Chess Championship at Lucerne 1950, where Hans Johner won, and won the Coupe Suisse twice.

Leepin played for Switzerland in friendly matches against France in 1946, Yugoslavia in 1949, and Saarland in 1955.

References

1920 births
1995 deaths
Swiss chess players
20th-century chess players